Orcus was a Roman god of the underworld.

Orcus may also refer to:
 90482 Orcus, a Kuiper belt object
 Orcus (beetle), a genus of beetles in the family Coccinellidae
 Orcus Patera, a large elongated depression the planet Mars
 Orcus (Dungeons & Dragons), a demon prince in the Dungeons & Dragons role-playing game
 Orcus, a major villain in the science fiction/fantasy Empire of the East series by Fred Saberhagen